Volver a la vida is a 1951 Argentine film directed by Carlos F. Borcosque.

Cast
  Amedeo Nazzari
  Malisa Zini
  Juan Carlos Barbieri
  Golde Flami
  Felisa Mary
  María Esther Buschiazzo
  Lalo Maura
  Raúl Miller
  Yuki Nambá
  Ada Cornaro
  Rafael Salvatore
  Enrique Abeledo
  Nino Persello
  Cirilo Etulain
  A. Fidel Britos
  Carlos Borcosque (junior)

References

External links
 

1951 films
1950s Spanish-language films
Argentine black-and-white films
Films directed by Carlos F. Borcosque
1950s Argentine films